Akiho is a Japanese given name and surname. According to WWWJDIC, there are more than a hundred different ways this name might be written in kanji.

People with this given name include:
Akiho Miyashiro (都城 秋穂, 1920–2008), Japanese male geologist
Akiho Yoshizawa (吉沢 明歩, born 1984), Japanese female adult video actress
Akiho Hayama (葉山 秋穂), fictional character, the heroine of Rakka Ryūsui
Akiho Ishiyama, supporting character of the French animated show Code Lyoko in which she is mother of main character Yumi Ishiyama
People with this surname include:
Andy Akiho (born 1971), American percussionist and composer
Atsushi Akiho, Japanese fencer, participant in fencing at the 1974 Asian Games
Fictional characters:
Akiho Nagomi, in Delicious Party Pretty Cure

References

Japanese-language surnames
Japanese unisex given names